Nanzih District (also spelled Nanzi) is a district located in Kaohsiung City, Taiwan. It was the northernmost district of Kaohsiung City until Kaohsiung County was merged into the municipality in 2010. Nanzih offers convenient access to transportation, including a train and bus station and an interchange on the Sun Yat-sen Freeway. Moreover, it also contains the Nanzih Industrial Zone.

Administrative divisions

The district consists of Qingfeng, Tungning, Wuchang, Xiangping, Zhongyang, Huinan, Huimin, Huifeng, Jinbing, Yubing, Jintian, Rentian, Ruibing, Cuibing, Hongnan, Hongyi, Hongrong, Guangchang, Jiuchang, Dachang, Fuchang, Chengchang, Taichang, Xingchang, Jianchang, Hongchang, Hechang, Qingchang, Longchang, Xiuchang, Yuchang, Guochang, Jiachang, Renchang, Lantian, Zhongxing and Zhonghe Village.

Education

Universities
 National Kaohsiung University of Science and Technology
 National University of Kaohsiung

Schools
 Kaohsiung Municipal Nanzih Comprehensive Senior High School

Tourist attractions
 Houjin River
 Kaohsiung Metropolitan Park
 Mount Banping
Nanzih Tianhou Temple
 Yang Family Historical Residence
 Youchang Forest Park
Zhongpu Daitian Temple

Transportation

Railway
TRA Western Line stations
 Nanzi Station (formerly Nanzih Station)

Kaohsiung Mass Rapid Transit Red Line stations
 Metropolitan Park Station
 Houjing Station
 Nanzih Export Processing Zone Station
 Oil Refinery Elementary School Station
 World Games Station

Highway
Sun Yat-sen Freeway Nanzi Interchange at 356 km 
Tai 1 line (Gaonan Highway) 
Tai 17 line (Coast Highway) 
Tai 22 line (Qinan Road)

See also
 Administrative divisions of Taiwan

References

External links

 

Districts of Kaohsiung